The study of village communities has become one of the fundamental methods of discussing the ancient history of institutions.

Wales 
Frederic Seebohm has called our attention to the interesting surveys of Welsh tracts of country made in the 14th century, soon after these regions passed into the hands of English lords. The fragments of these surveys published by him and his commentary on them are very illuminating, but further study of the documents themselves discloses many important details and helps to correct some theories propounded on the subject.

The description of Astret Canon, a trev or township (villata) of the honour of Denbigh, surveyed in 1334 was the time of the native Welsh princes. It was occupied entirely by a kindred (progenies) of free tribesmen descended from a certain Canon, the son of Lawaurgh. The kindred was subdivided into four gavells or bodies of joint-tenants. On the haif-gavell of Monryk ap Canon, e.g. there are no less than sixteen coparceners, of whom eight possess houses. The peculiarity of this system of land tenure consists in the fact that all the tenants of these gavells derive their position on the land from the occupation of the township by their kindred, and have to trace their rights to shares in the original unit. Although the village of Astret Canon was, occupied under the Survey by something like fifty-four male tenants, the majority of whom were settled in houses of their own, it continued to form a unit as well in regard to the payment of tungpound, that is, of the direct land tax and other services and payments, but also in respect of the possession and usage of the soil. On the other hand, movable property is owned in severalty. Services have to be apportioned among the members of the kindreds according to the number of heads of cattle owned by them.

From the description of another township, Pireyon we may gather another important feature of this tribal tenure. The population of this village also clitistered in gavells, and we hear that these gavells ought to be considered as equal shares in respect of the Arabic, the wood and the waste of the township. If the shares were reduced into acres there would have fallen to each of the eight gavells of Pireyon ninety-one acres, one rood and a half and six perches of arable and woodland, and fifty-three and one-third of an acre and half a rood of waste land. But as a matter of fact the land was not divided in such a way, and the rights of the tenants of the gavell were realized not through the appropriation of definite acres, but as proportionate opportunities in regard to tillage and as to usages in pasture, wood and waste. Pastoral habits must have greatly contributed to give the system of landholding its peculiar character. It was not necessary, it would have been even harmful, to subdivide sharply the area on which the herds of cows and the flocks of sheep and goats were grazing. Still Welsh rural life in the  14th century had already a definite though subordinate agricultural aspect, and it is important to notice that individual appropriation had as yet made very slight progress in it.

Slavonic 
Let us now compare this description of Celtic tribal tenure with Slavonic institutions. The most striking modern examples of tribal communities settled on a territorial basis are presented by the history of the South Slavs in the Balkan Peninsula and in Austria, of Slovenes, Croats, Serbs and Bulgarians, but it is easy to trace customs of the same kind in the memories of West Slavs conquered by Germans, of the Poles and of the different subdivisions of the Russians.

A good clue to the subject is provided by a Serb proverb which says that a man by himself is bound to be a martyr. One might almost suggest that these popular customs illustrate the Aristotelian conception of the single man seeking the autarkeia, a complete and self-sufficient existence in the society of his fellow-men, and arriving at the stage of the tribal village, the yivoc, as described in the famous introductory chapter of the Greek philosophers Politie. The Slavs of the mountainous regions of the Balkans and of the Alps in their stubborn struggle with nature and with human enemies have clustered and still cluster to some extent (in Montenegro) in closely united and widely spreading brotherhoods (bratstva) and tribes (plemena). Some of these brotherhoods derive their names from a real or supposed commoun ancestor, and are composed of relatives as well as of affiliated strangers. They number sometimes hundreds of members, of guns, as the fighting males are characteristically called. Such Kovacevii, as one might say in Old English the Vukotings or Kovachevings, of Montenegro. The dwellings, fields, and pasturages of these brotherhoods or kindreds are scattered over the country, and it is not always possible to trace them in compact divisions on the map. But there was the closest union in war, revenge, funeral rites, marriage arrangements, provision for the poor and for those who stand in need of special help, as, for instance, in case of fires, inundations and the like.

And corresponding to this union there existed a strong feeling of unity in regard to property, especially property in land. Although ownership was divided among the different families, a kind of superior or eminent domain stretched over the whole of the brat stvo, and was expressed in the participation in common in pasture and wood, in the right to control alienations of land and to exercise pre-emption. If any of the members of the brotherhood wanted to get rid of his share he had to apply first to his next of kin within the family and then to the further kinsmen of the brat stvo.

Russia 

Attention however, should be called more particularly to the parallel phenomena in the social history of the Russians, where the conditions seem to stand out in specially strong contrast with those prevailing among the mountain Slavs of the Balkans and of the Alps. In the enormous extent of Russia we have to reckon with widely different geographical and racial areas, among other, with the Steppe settlements of the so-called Little Russians in the Ukraine and the forest settlements of the Great Russians in the north.

In spite of great divergencies the economic history of all these branches of Slavonic stock gravitates towards one main type, viz, towards rural unions of kinsmen, on the basis of enlarged households. In. the south the typical village settlement is the big court or hamlet consisting of some four to eight related families holding together; in the north it is the big oven, a hamlet of somewhat smaller size in which three to five families are closely united for purposes of common husbandry.

Germany 
The Saxon or Ditmarschen portion of this region gives us an opportunity of observing the effects of an extended and highly systematized tribal organization on Germanic soil. The independence of this northern peasant republic, which reminds one of the Swiss cantons, lasted until the time of the Reformation. We find the Ditmarschen organized in the 15th, as they had been in the 10th century, in a number of large kindred~, partly composed of relatives by blood and partly of cousins who had joined them. The membership of these kindreds is based on agnatic ties that is, on relationship through males or on affiliation as a substitute for such agnatic kinship. The families or households are grouped into brotherhoods, and these again into clans or Schlachten (Geschlechter), corresponding to Roman gentes. Some of them could put as many as 500 warriors in the field. They took their names from ancestors and chieftains: the Wollersmannen, Hennemannen, Jerremannen, etc.; that is, the men of Woll, the men of Refine, the men of Jerre., In spite of these personal names the organization of the clans was by no means a monarchical one: it was based on the participation of the full-grown fighting men in the government of each clan and on a council of co-opted elders at the head of the entire federation. We need not repeat here what has already been stated about the mutual support which such clans afforded to their members in war and in peace, in judicial and in economic matters.

Scandinavia 
We must point out some facts from the range of Scandinavian customs. In the mountainous districts of Norway we notice the same tendency towards the unification of holdings as in the plains and hills of Schleswig and Holstein. The bonder of Gudbrandsdalen and Telemarken, the free peasantry tilling the soil and pasturing herds on the slopes of the hills since the days of Harold Hrfagr to our own times, sit in Odalgaards, or freehold estates, from which supernumerary heirs are removed on receiving some indemnity, and which are protected from alienation into strange hands by the privilege of pre-emption exercised by relatives of the seller.

Equally suggestive are some facts on the Danish side of the Straits. Here again we have to do with normal holdings independent of the number of coheirs, but dependent on the requirements of agricultureon the plough and oxen, on certain constant relations between the arable of an estate and its outlying commons, meadows and woods. The bl does not stand by itself like the Norwegian guard, but is fitted into a very close union with neighboring bids of the same kind. Practices of coaration, of open-field intermixture, of compulsory rotation of lot-meadows, of stinting the commons, arise of themselves in the villages of Denmark and Sweden. Laws compiled in the 13th century but based on even more ancient customs give us most interesting and definite information as to Scandinavian practices of allotment.

Conclusion 
In conclusion, it seems that they may be stated under the following heads:

 Primitive stages of civilization disclose in human society a strong tendency towards mutual support in economic matters as well as for the sake of defence.
 The most natural form assumed by such unions for defence and co-operation is that of kinship.
 In epochs of pastoral husbandry and of the beginnings of agriculture land is mainly owned by tribes, kindreds and enlarged households, while individuals enjoy only rights of usage and possession.
 In course of time unions of neighbors are substituted for unions of kinsmen.
 In Germanic societies the community of the township rests on the foundation of efficient holdingsbids, hides, hufenkept together as far as possible by rules of united or single succession.
 The open-field system, which prevailed in the whole of Northern Europe for nearly a thousand years, was closely dependent on the customs of tribal and neighborly unions.
 Even now the treatment of commons represents the last manifestations of ancient communal arrangements, and it can only be reasonably and justly interpreted by reference to the law and practice of former times.

References

Types of organization
Anthropology